The 2004 Washington Democratic presidential caucuses were held on February 7, 2004. The Caucus is open to registered Democrats and Independents. The delegate allocation is proportional, the candidates are awarded delegates in proportion to the percentage of votes received. A total of 76 (of 95) delegates are awarded proportionally. A 15 percent threshold is required to receive delegates. No actual convention delegates are awarded at the caucuses, rather each precinct caucus chooses delegates to attend the County Convention.

Analysis
This election caucus was immediately following Super Tuesday, where John Kerry dominated and continued his momentum. Kerry won the blue state of Washington with 48% of the vote, winning every county and congressional district except for the 7th district, which Dean carried with just under 40%. Turnout was overall very low in the state. The highest turnout by far was when over 9,500 people showed to vote in King County, Washington, where Kerry won with 44%. Kerry's weakest performance in the state was in Jefferson County, Washington, where he got just 39% of the vote. Howard Dean and Dennis Kucinich also got a share of the delegates.

Statewide Results
Primary date: February 7, 2004

Sources
Dave Leip's U.S. Election Atlas

Washington
2004
2004 Washington (state) elections